Antoninho Muchanga (born 24 November 1965) is a Mozambican former footballer who played as a midfielder for Maxaquene. At international level, he made 18 appearances for the Mozambique national team from 1994 to 2000. He was also named in Mozambique's squad for the 1996 African Cup of Nations tournament.

References

1965 births
Living people
Mozambican footballers
Sportspeople from Maputo
Association football midfielders
Mozambique international footballers
1996 African Cup of Nations players
C.D. Maxaquene players